Glyptosternon is a genus of sisorid catfishes native to Asia.

Species
There are currently four recognized species in this genus:
 Glyptosternon akhtari Silas, 1952
 Glyptosternon maculatum (Regan, 1905)
 Glyptosternon reticulatum McClelland, 1842 (Turkestan catfish)
 Glyptosternon oschanini Herzenstein, 1889 (Oshanin catfish)

Distribution
 species are distributed in Indus drainage in Afghanistan, Pakistan, India (in the state of Jammu and Kashmir), Uzbekistan, Tajikistan, Kyrgyzstan and western China, east to the Irrawaddy drainage in Burma.  is from the Bamian River of the Oxus Watershed of the Indus drainage in Afghanistan.  is found in the Brahmaputra drainage of India and China.  is from the Indus drainage including Afghanistan, Pakistan, Kashmir, and western China.  is known from the Upper Syr Darya and probably Amu Darya in Kyrgyzstan, Uzbekistan and Tajikistan

Description
Exostoma is distinguished by having the combination of an interrupted groove behind the lip (post-labial groove), the gill openings extending onto the underside (venter), homodont dentition with pointed teeth in both jaws, a crescent-shaped tooth patch in the upper jaw, and 10–12 branched pectoral rays. The head is depressed with a broadly rounded snout. The body is elongate and flattened ventrally to the pelvic fins. The eyes are minute, dorsally located, and under the skin (subcutaneous). The lips are thick, fleshy, and papillated. The teeth in both jaws are pointed and the tooth patches in the upper jaw are joined, forming a band produced posteriorly at sides (crescent-shaped). The paired fins are plaited to form an adhesive apparatus.

Glyptosternon malaisei was known only from the type, which is from the Irrawaddy drainage in Burma. A recently published study reidentifies G. malaisei as a species of Glaridoglanis, on the basis of the spatulate, homodont dentition on both jaws and the premaxillary tooth patch not extending posterolaterally; and considers it to be a junior subjective synonym of Glaridoglanis andersonii.

Ecology
 is found in mountain rapids.  is found in rivers and streams under stones and rocks. It feeds mainly on invertebrates, especially insect larvae.

References

Sisoridae
Fish of Asia
Fish of Afghanistan
Freshwater fish of China
Freshwater fish of India
Fish of Myanmar
Fish of Pakistan
Fish of Central Asia
Taxa named by John McClelland (doctor)
Freshwater fish genera
Catfish genera